is a Japanese former professional track and field sprinter. He finished sixth in the 100 metres at the 2002 Asian Championships and finished fourth in the 4 × 100 metres relay. He was also the 1999 Asian junior champion in the 4 × 100 metres relay and the 1999 Japanese junior champion in the 200 metres.

Personal bests

International competition

References

External links

1980 births
Living people
Japanese male sprinters
Sportspeople from Chiba Prefecture